Umbravirus is a genus of plant viruses assigned to the family Tombusviridae. The genus has 11 species.

Transmission may be by aphids or mechanical inoculation. The genome is a linear, positive-sense, single-stranded RNA, 4200–6900 nucleotides in length.

Taxonomy
The genus contains the following species:

Carrot mottle mimic virus
Carrot mottle virus
Ethiopian tobacco bushy top virus
Groundnut rosette virus
Ixeridium yellow mottle virus 2
Lettuce speckles mottle virus
Opium poppy mosaic virus
Patrinia mild mottle virus
Pea enation mosaic virus 2
Tobacco bushy top virus
Tobacco mottle virus

References

External links
 Viralzone: Umbravirus

Umbraviruses
Viral plant pathogens and diseases
Virus genera